Paul Killiam (September 12, 1916 – November 12, 1998) was an entertainer, film historian, and film collector who provided comedic narration at showings of silent films, including as host on his own television show. He was a pioneer in film preservation and the reintroduction of old films to the viewing public during the television era. He amassed a large and valuable collection of films. It was sold to various buyers after his death.

Killiam was host of Hometown TV, which debuted on WOR-TV on November 17, 1952. From off-camera he narrated old films and other material. He performed on The Steve Allen Show delivering a comedic monologue about his film company and then delivering contemporary narration over silent film footage from a film about cave dweller era relations. He hosted the Paul Killiam Show which featured a similar format of comedic introduction followed by ridiculous narration of old films including from the Thomas Alva Edison's Edison Studio.

An orchestra purchased some of the films in his collection.

He hosted the show Hour of Silents.

His film company lost a suit over the film rights to The Son of the Sheik.

In 1983, the New York Times reported on his activities.

See also
Ben Model

References

External links

American entertainers
American film historians
1916 births
1998 deaths